The 1987 World Judo Championships were the 15th edition of the World Judo Championships, and were held in Essen, West Germany from November 19–22, 1987.

Medal overview

Men

Women

Medal table

References

External links
Results of the World Championships Essen, 1987, West Germany on www.judoinside.com
Videos of fights found by de.video.search.yahoo.com

W
J
World Judo Championships
Judo